Orkun Özdemir (born 23 April 1995) is a Turkish footballer who plays as a goalkeeper for Ümraniyespor.

Professional career
Özdemir is a youth product of Damlaspor, Beşiktaş, Dikilitaşspor, and İstanbul Başakşehir. He began his senior career as the backup goalkeeper with Fatih Karagümrük in the TFF Second League without making a senior appearance in the 2014–15 season. He spent 2015–16 with the amateur club Büyükçekmece Belediyespor, and in August 2016 transferred to Ladik Belediyespor. He also spent the 2017–18 season with the amateur club Altinova Belediyespor. He returned to professional football with Serik Belediyespor in the TFF Third League where he stayed 2 seasons. On 10 August 2020, he moved up 2 divisions to play with Ümraniyespor in the TFF First League. He helped the club achieve promotion to the Süper Lig for the 2022–23 season. He made his professional debut with Ümraniyespor in a 1–0 Süper Lig loss to Trabzonspor on 2 September 2022.

References

External links
 
 

1995 births
Living people
People from Kars Province
Turkish footballers
Fatih Karagümrük S.K. footballers
Ümraniyespor footballers
Süper Lig players
TFF First League players
TFF Second League players
TFF Third League players
Association football goalkeepers